Robert Stevens (born May 23, 1985) is an American politician from Tennessee. He is a Republican and represents District 13 in the Tennessee House of Representatives.

Stevens graduated from Middle Tennessee Christian School. He earned a degree in political science from Lipscomb University, and a Juris Doctor from the University of Memphis. He was first elected in 2022.

References 

Living people
Tennessee Republicans
Members of the Tennessee House of Representatives
21st-century American politicians
Lipscomb University alumni
University of Memphis alumni
1985 births